Rang is an Assamese language general entertainment television channel owned by Riniki Bhuyan Sarma and held by Pride East Entertainments Pvt. Ltd. of Guwahati, Assam. It is a sister channel of Assamese news channel News Live.

Currently Broadcast

Devotional show
Upasana (Devotional Show)

Serials

Formerly broadcast

Live show 
Sammannay Yatra

Assamese dubbed shows
Devon Ke Dev...Mahadev
Mahabharat 1988
Vikram Betal

Cookery Show

Comedy series

Fenkhuwa
Kosugoti
Miss Junali LLB
Ningni Bhaurar Kotha

Drama series

Akash - Eti Mitha Naam
Akaxor Thikona Bisari
Anuradha
Anurag Tumar Babe (Anthology)
Bhagya Bidhata
Bhairavi
Bindaaas
Boidehi
Chameli Mamsaab
Dapun
Dohon
Girl‌'s Hostel
Hepahor Ghar
Indradhanu
Jonaki Kareng (Anthology)
Junakor Borokun
Logon
Maharathi
Meghranjani
Monmandir
Patal Bhairavi
Pita Putra (Anthology)
Pratigya
Raginee
Rang Jiwanar (Anthology)
Rodali
Runjun
Sahu Buwari (Anthology)
Sangjog
Sukula Meghor Cha (Telefilm Series/Anthology)
Tumi Dusokute Kajol Lole
Umal Bukur Hejar Kahini (Anthology)
Xopunar Asutia Rang

Thriller 
Aparadh
Assam Fights Back
Birangona
F.I.R.
Sabda

Reality shows
Jhankar
Kisme Kitna Hai Dum
Moi Axom Dekhor Suwali
Schoolwiz
Sangeetor Maharan

Chat shows
Aare Aare Kichu Kotha
Bhagya Laxmi
Junaki Batere
Madhurima
Musical Couch
Rang Dhemali

Others
5 Parichalakar 5 Chobi
Bhaona
Mohini
Paakghar
Pratham Rengoni
The Food Bay
 Ghorot Kun Ase

Music shows
Gungun

News shows
Page 3
Limelight

See also
List of longest-running Indian television series
List of Assamese-language television channels

References

External links
 Rang TV at You Tube

Assamese-language mass media
Television stations in Guwahati
Assamese-language television channels
Television channels and stations established in 2009
Pride East Entertainments